Kaese Mill is a historic grist mill located at Accident, Garrett County, Maryland, United States.  It was constructed about 1868, and is a -story frame water-powered grist mill.  It is the only fully operational water-powered grist mill in Maryland.  It was built by Henry August Kaese, Sr., an immigrant miller from Germany who settled in Garrett County shortly after the American Civil War.

Kaese Mill was listed on the National Register of Historic Places in 1984.

References

External links
, including photo from 1981, at Maryland Historical Trust

Grinding mills in Maryland
Buildings and structures in Garrett County, Maryland
German-American culture in Maryland
National Register of Historic Places in Garrett County, Maryland
Grinding mills on the National Register of Historic Places in Maryland